The 2013 Pan American Road Cycling Championships took place in Zacatecas, Mexico, May 1–5, 2013.

Medal summary

Men

Women

Men (under 23)

References

Americas
Cycling
Pan American Road and Track Championships
International cycle races hosted by Mexico